KDME-LP (98.3 FM) is a radio station licensed to Fort Madison, Iowa, United States.  The station is currently owned by Divine Mercy Educational Radio Association.

References

External links
 

DME-LP
DME-LP